Three Way is a city in Madison County, Tennessee. The population was 1,709 at the 2010 census. It is included in the Jackson, Tennessee Metropolitan Statistical Area.

Before the city was officially incorporated in 1998, the area was commonly known as "Three Way" for a number of years because of the split by U.S. Route 45 along its north–south route into US 45W towards Humboldt and US 45E towards Milan.

Geography
Three Way is located at  (35.776424, -88.851111).

Demographics

As of the census of 2000, there were 1,375 people, 499 households, and 421 families residing in the city. The population density was 354.4 people per square mile (136.8/km2). There were 510 housing units at an average density of 131.4 per square mile (50.8/km2). The racial makeup of the city was 94.33% White, 4.65% African American, 0.29% Asian, 0.22% from other races, and 0.51% from two or more races. Hispanic or Latino of any race were 1.75% of the population.

There were 499 households, out of which 45.1% had children under the age of 18 living with them, 79.6% were married couples living together, 3.6% had a female householder with no husband present, and 15.6% were non-families. 13.6% of all households were made up of individuals, and 3.6% had someone living alone who was 65 years of age or older. The average household size was 2.76 and the average family size was 3.04.

In the city, the population was spread out, with 28.3% under the age of 18, 4.5% from 18 to 24, 37.5% from 25 to 44, 22.6% from 45 to 64, and 7.1% who were 65 years of age or older. The median age was 36 years. For every 100 females, there were 95.0 males. For every 100 females age 18 and over, there were 98.4 males.

The median income for a household in the city was $62,135, and the median income for a family was $67,188. Males had a median income of $40,769 versus $31,541 for females. The per capita income for the city was $23,313. About 2.6% of families and 4.0% of the population were below the poverty line, including 6.4% of those under age 18 and 20.8% of those age 65 or over.

References

Cities in Madison County, Tennessee
Cities in Tennessee
Jackson metropolitan area, Tennessee